Dai primitivi all'elettronica (From primitive to electronic) is a recording made by Futuro Antico in 1980. It features a mixture of synthesized and ethnic music, highlighting the role intonation plays in music. This theme was featured in Tappo Volante, the last Aktuala album, which featured the mixture of ethnic sounds and studio processing. The track "Echo Raga" is featured on that recording as well.

They recruited a number of musicians from India and Africa for the recording. There was an initial pressing of 350 tapes made, due to lack of major label interests. After a number of bootlegs surfaced, an LP run of 1000 was pressed.

Personnel 
 Gabin Debirè: tambourines, xylophone, tom-tom, hiss, rasp, zanza, ektar, whirling sticks, bongos, conga, wood, talking drum, rattles
 Walter Maioli: nai flute, eagle-bone flute, African whistle, bells, bass harmonica, mouth bow, maranzano, opium flute, jangro, calls, rattles
 Riccardo Sinigaglia: synthesizer, piano, organ, echoes, bongos, Tibetan bells
 Kala: tambura
 Oiseau: tambura

Tracks 
Cassette tape tracks originally:
Side A
 Eco Raga
 Piano Synt
 Sinikoro Kuma

Side B
 Concrete Music - Oa.Oa
 Suoni Naturali

References

External links 
 Maioli's page dedicated to Futuro Antico

1980 albums